Stuart Percy (born May 18, 1993) is a Canadian professional ice hockey defenceman who is currently playing for Vaasan Sport in the Liiga. He was selected 25th overall in the 2011 NHL Entry Draft by the Toronto Maple Leafs.

Playing career
On September 21, 2011, Percy was cut from the Toronto Maple Leafs training camp and sent back to major junior due to the impending lock-out. On November 22, 2011, the Maple Leafs signed Percy to a three-year, entry-level contract.

Following an impressive preseason, Percy started the 2014–15 season on the Leafs but was returned to the Toronto Marlies after playing seven games with the Maple Leafs.

At the conclusion of his entry-level contract, following the 2015–16 season, Percy was not tendered a contract as a restricted free agent, releasing him to free agency. On July 1, 2016, Percy was signed by the Pittsburgh Penguins to a one-year, two-way contract worth $575,000 at the NHL level. He was assigned to AHL affiliate, the Wilkes-Barre/Scranton Penguins for the duration of his contract.

As a free agent from the Penguins, Percy was not offered a contract offer over the summer for the 2017–18 season. On October 21, 2017, he agreed to a professional try-out contract with the Rochester Americans of the AHL, affiliate to the Buffalo Sabres. Percy impressed and soon secured a one-year contract to remain with the Americans. He responded with a professional best season in contributing with personal highs of 7 goals and 27 assists for 34 points in 67 games.

On July 26, 2018, Percy agreed as a free agent to a one-year AHL contract with the Belleville Senators, affiliate to the Ottawa Senators. In the 2018–19 season, Percy registered 19 points in 41 games from the blueline for Belleville before he was traded to the Providence Bruins in exchange for Austin Fyten on March 4, 2019. Percy played out the remainder of the season with the P-Bruins, registering 5 points in 14 games.

As an un-signed free agent over the summer, Percy returned to the Belleville Senators on a professional try-out to begin the 2019–20 season on October 21, 2019. He appeared in just 5 games before his season was halted through an elbow injury.

As a free agent, Percy opted to pursue a European career, agreeing to a one-year contract with Finnish club, Vaasan Sport of the Liiga, on July 3, 2020.

International play

 

As a junior, Percy featured in his first international tournament with Team Canada Ontario in the 2010 World U-17 Hockey Challenge, claiming a silver medal. He was then selected to the U18 Canadian team to appear and help retain the title in the 2010 Ivan Hlinka Tournament

Personal
Growing up, Percy was a fan of the Toronto Maple Leafs, and had posters of former team players such as Mats Sundin, Tie Domi and Doug Gilmour lining his bedroom walls. Leading up to his draft year, Percy had hoped to be selected by the Maple Leafs.

Percy is friends with fellow 2011 draft selections Matt Puempel and Ryan Strome, whom he celebrated with after being drafted.

Percy is cousins with hockey players Carlo Colaiacovo and Paulo Colaiacovo. Carlo was also a first round pick of the Maple Leafs, being selected 17th overall in 2001.

Career statistics

Regular season and playoffs

International

Awards and honours

References

External links 
 

1993 births
Living people
Belleville Senators players
Canadian ice hockey defencemen
Ice hockey people from Ontario
Mississauga St. Michael's Majors players
Mississauga Steelheads players
National Hockey League first-round draft picks
Providence Bruins players
Rochester Americans players
Sportspeople from Oakville, Ontario
Toronto Maple Leafs draft picks
Toronto Maple Leafs players
Toronto Marlies players
Wilkes-Barre/Scranton Penguins players
Canadian sportspeople of Japanese descent